The Bodoland People's Front (BPF) is a state political party in Assam, India. The party is headquartered in Kokrajhar Town and previously was in ruling government in the autonomous region of Bodoland.

History 

The BPF was formed as political party in year 2005, Hagrama Mohilary and Emmanuel Mosahary were selected as the President and the General Secretary of the new party. Hagrama Mohilary formed the first Elected Executive Bodoland Territorial Council after the end of the election.Bodoland Peoples Front formed as per the resolution Vide No. 3, adopted in the Political convention held on 4th and 5th December 2005, as per BPF constitution, BPF shall bear true faith and allegiance to the constitution of India as established by law and to the principles of democracy, socialism and secularism as enshrined in the Indian Constitution, and also solemnly affirm our commitment to work for upholding the sovereignty, unity and integrity of India. To work for strengthening the Indian Nationalism providing due respect to the identities of all sections of people.The party began its journey in the 2011 Assam Legislative election where the party stormed and surprised everyone by winning 12 seats. The party also became the 3rd largest party behind INC and AIUDF, and this was considering the fact that the party had only contested 29 seats. Ahead of the 2016 Assam legislative election the party joined the National Democratic Alliance. The party was assigned 16 seats as per the agreement and won the same 12 seats. Despite just winning 12 seats the party had the best winning percentage and was part of the government in Assam. Then in 2021 the party left National Democratic Alliance and joined the United Progressive Alliance ahead of the 2021 Assam election. The party was assigned 12 seats and only ended up winning 4 seats, later the party decided to formally announce its departure from United Progressive Alliance, due to poor performance in the election.

Electoral performance

Development in BTC

Educational Institutions 
 Bodoland University, Kokrajhar
 Central Institute of Technology, Kokrajhar
 Bineswar Brahma Engineering College, Kokrajhar
 Medical College, Besorgaon, Kokrajhar
 Nursing College, Kokrajhar

BTC chief Hagrama Mohilary laid the foundation stone of Udalguri Engineering College.

BTC chief Hagrama Mohilary  laid the foundation stone of a Rs 26-crore IT park at Onthai Gwlao, Chandamari, nearly 4 km northwest of Kokrajhar town.

See also
 Bodo Liberation Tigers Force
 Bodo People's Progressive Front

References

 
State political parties in Assam
Bodoland
Political parties in Assam
Recognised state political parties in India
Political parties established in 2005
2005 establishments in Assam